The European Film Award for Best Composer is one of the awards presented by the European Film Academy. It was first presented as a Special Jury Award in 1998 received by Yuri Khanon for the music of Days of Eclipse. A set of nominees was presented from 1989 to 1990 and from 2004 and 2012. Since 2013, only one winner is presented without nominees.

Winners and nominees

1980s

1990s

2000s

2010s

2020s

References

External links 
 European Film Academy archive
 Nominees and winners  at the European Film Academy website

Composer
 
Film music awards
Film awards for best score
Awards established in 1988